Many happy returns is a greeting, often for birthdays.

Many Happy Returns may also refer to:

Television 
 "Many Happy Returns" (The Prisoner), a 1967 episode of the British television series The Prisoner
 "Many Happy Returns" (Diagnosis Murder), a 1994 episode of the American television series Diagnosis Murder
 "Many Happy Returns" (Eureka), a 2006 episode of the American television series Eureka
 "Many Happy Returns" (Person of Interest), an episode of the American television drama series Person of Interest
 Many Happy Returns (TV series), a 1964–1965 American television series
 Many Happy Returns to Lazarus, a 2004 television documentary about Simon Lazarus
 "Many Happy Returns", an episode of the animated television series Timothy Goes to School
 "Many Happy Returns", an episode of the BBC sitcom Goodnight Sweetheart
 "Many Happy Returns", an episode of the television series Ben 10: Omniverse
 "Many Happy Returns" (Sherlock), a 2013 "mini-sode" of the BBC television series Sherlock
 "Happy Returns", a 1985 episode of the BBC sitcom Only Fools and Horses

Film 
 Many Happy Returns (1922 film), a 1922 black-and-white silent short subject starring Vera White
 Many Happy Returns (1934 film), a 1934 film starring George Burns and Gracie Allen
 Many Happy Returns (1986 film), a 1986 TV movie starring George Segal and Ron Leibman
 Kyôso tanjô (English: Many Happy Returns), a 1993 Japanese comedy starring Takeshi Kitano
 Many Happy Returns (1996 animated film), Director/Animator Marjut Rimminen

Other 
 Many Happy Returns: The Hits, a 1992 greatest hits collection by singer Gary Glitter
 "Many Happy Returns", a song by Inspiral Carpets from the album Life
 "Many Happy Returns", a song by ABC from the album The Lexicon of Love
 "Many Happy Returns", a story arc in the 1996 Supergirl series by Peter David and Gary Frank
 Many Happy Returns, a 1942 comedy book on the income tax by Groucho Marx
 Happy Returns (company), an American software and reverse logistics company
 "Happy Returns", a song by Steven Wilson from the album Hand. Cannot. Erase.
 The Happy Return, the first of the Horatio Hornblower novels by C. S. Forester